The Robert Creeley Foundation was a poetry foundation based in Acton, Massachusetts, dedicated to honoring the legacy of American poet Robert Creeley. The Foundation ceased operations in 2018.

Robert Creeley Award
The following are the winners of the Robert Creeley Award:
 2001 — Robert Creeley
 2002 — Galway Kinnell
 2003 — Grace Paley
 2004 — Martín Espada
 2005 — C. D. Wright
 2006 — Carolyn Forché
 2007 — Yusef Komunyakaa
 2008 — John Ashbery
 2009 — Sonia Sanchez
 2010 — Gary Snyder
 2011 — Bruce Weigl
 2012 — Thomas Lux
 2013 — Naomi Shihab Nye
 2014 — Mary Ruefle
 2015 — Ron Padgett
 2016 — Tracy K. Smith
 2017 — Marie Howe
 2018 — Mark Doty

Student programs 
The Foundation also awarded the Helen Creeley Student Poetry Prize to honor Robert Creeley's older sister Helen, a prize-winning poet while she was a high school student, who was an early mentor to Robert. The prize is awarded to one or two Massachusetts high school students each year.

References

Poetry organizations
Organizations based in Massachusetts